Pseudonus is a genus of viviparous brotulas.

Species
There are currently two recognized species in this genus:
 Pseudonus acutus Garman, 1899
 Pseudonus squamiceps (Lloyd, 1907)

References

Bythitidae